The Aguayo Aldea Vocational High School (Spanish: Escuela Superior Vocacional Aguayo Aldea), popularly known as La Vocacional, is a historic school in Caguas, Puerto Rico, named after Nicolás Aguayo Aldea, a Puerto Rican writer and politician from the 19th century. The Art Deco building dates to 1939 and was designed by architects Lizardi & Díaz Diez.

Although originally an elementary and intermediary school, La Vocacional became a high school in 1960. The school building was added to the National Register of Historic Places on August 4, 1987, and it still functions as a vocational school.

See also
 National Register of Historic Places listings in central Puerto Rico

References 

School buildings on the National Register of Historic Places in Puerto Rico
Art Deco architecture in Puerto Rico
School buildings completed in 1939
1939 establishments in Puerto Rico
Caguas, Puerto Rico
Vocational schools